The Dudek Max is a Polish single-place, paraglider that was designed and produced by Dudek Paragliding of Bydgoszcz. It is now out of production.

Design and development
The Max was designed as an intermediate glider and made from Skytex material with Technora lines. The models are each named for their approximate wing area in square metres.

Operational history
Reviewer Noel Bertrand described the Max in a 2003 review as "technically very elaborate".

The design has been flown in several competitions, including:
 Richard Żygadło Max-29A Polish Paramotor Championship 1999
 Marcin Tobiszewski Max-27A Polish Paragliding Championship 1999
 Jerzy Kraus Max-29A Polish Paragliding Championship 1999
 Zbyszek Gotkiewicz Max-27A Polish Paragliding Championship 1999

Variants
Max 25
Small-sized model for lightweight pilots. The glider model is AFNOR Standard certified.
Max 27
Mid-sized model for medium weight pilots. The glider model is AFNOR Standard certified.
Max 29
Large-sized model for heavier pilots. The glider model is AFNOR Standard certified.

Specifications (Max-27)

References

External links

Max
Paragliders